Trichostola is a genus of leaf beetles in the subfamily Eumolpinae. It is distributed on the Mascarene Islands. Some species placed in the genus have also been described from mainland Africa and Madagascar, but according to Jan Bechyné (1957) these actually belong to other genera. Additionally, some species described from Australia were placed in the genus by Julius Weise in 1923, but these are also considered to be misplaced.

Species
Species described from Réunion and Mauritius:

 Trichostola alluaudi Jacoby, 1898
 Trichostola aurata Jacoby, 1898
 Trichostola berliozi Bechyné, 1957
 Trichostola berliozi antennalis Bechyné, 1957
 Trichostola berliozi berliozi Bechyné, 1957
 Trichostola callitrichia Bechyné, 1957
 Trichostola cariei Berlioz, 1915
 Trichostola chapuisi Jacoby, 1898
 Trichostola chrysoptera Bechyné, 1957
 Trichostola collaris Berlioz, 1915
 Trichostola collaris collaris Berlioz, 1915
 Trichostola collaris reunionis Bechyné, 1957
 Trichostola cribricollis Berlioz, 1915
 Trichostola emmerezi Berlioz, 1915
 Trichostola evops Berlioz, 1915
 Trichostola evops evops Berlioz, 1915
 Trichostola evops vicaria Bechyné, 1957
 Trichostola fasciatipennis Jacoby, 1902
 Trichostola femoralis Jacoby, 1902
 Trichostola intermedia Berlioz, 1915
 Trichostola mameti Bechyné, 1957
 Trichostola ornata Berlioz, 1915
 Trichostola perilampina Bechyné, 1957
 Trichostola pilula Berlioz, 1915
 Trichostola striatipennis Jacoby, 1898
 Trichostola tenuepunctata Berlioz, 1915
 Trichostola thoracica Jacoby, 1902
 Trichostola umbilicata Bechyné, 1957
 Trichostola variegata Jacoby, 1898
 Trichostola vestita (Boheman, 1858)
 Trichostola vestita vestita (Boheman, 1858)
 Trichostola vestita viridicata Bechyné, 1957
 Trichostola vinsoni Bechyné, 1957

Species described from Rodrigues Island:
 Trichostola pauliani Vinson, 1961 (nomen nudum)

Species described from mainland Africa and Madagascar (to be placed in other genera):
 Trichostola capensis Lefèvre, 1890 – South Africa, now placed in Lucignolo
 Trichostola fuscitarsis Chapuis, 1879 – Ethiopia, Somalia
 Trichostola grandis Fairmaire, 1901 – Madagascar, now placed in Pseudostola
 Trichostola grossa Harold, 1878 – Tanzania
 Trichostola lefevrei Jacoby, 1898 – South Africa
 Trichostola magnicollis Fairmaire, 1886 – Djibouti

Species described from Australia (or Trichostola Weise, 1923)
 Trichostola amoena Weise, 1923
 Trichostola macilenta Weise, 1923
 Trichostola multiseriata Weise, 1923
 Trichostola nubila Weise, 1923
 Trichostola peregrina Weise, 1923
 Trichostola similis Weise, 1923

References

External links
 Genus Trichostola Weise, 1923 at Australian Faunal Directory

Eumolpinae
Chrysomelidae genera
Insects of Mauritius
Insects of Réunion
Beetles of Africa
Taxa named by Félicien Chapuis